Resia may refer to:


Locations in northern Italy

South Tyrol
 Resia, a frazione (subdivision) of the village Graun im Vinschgau
 Reschen Pass, a border pass connecting Italy and Austria
 Reschensee,, a reservoir near Reschen Pass

Province of Udine
 Resia, Friuli, a town and commune (municipality)
 Resia Valley, an Alpine glacial valley near Moggio Udinese

Other
 Resia (plant), a genus in subfamily Gesnerioideae
 Resian dialect, a Slovene dialect spoken in the Resia valley
 Resia gens, a family of ancient Rome

See also